The Cerro Gordo Mines are a collection of abandoned mines located in Cerro Gordo in the Inyo Mountains, Inyo County, near Lone Pine, California. Mining operations spanned 1866 to 1957, producing high grade silver, lead, zinc ore, and more rarely gold ore and copper ore. Some ore was smelted on site, but larger capacity smelters were eventually constructed along the shore of nearby Owens Lake.

These smelting operations were the beginnings of the towns of Swansea and Keeler. Most of the metal ingots produced here were transported to Los Angeles, but transportation difficulties hindered the success of the mines. Mining of silver and lead peaked in the early 1880s, with a second mining boom producing zinc in the 1910s.

During its peak, Cerro Gordo was home to some 4,700 people and the site is known as a California ghost town today.

History
Discovery of the silver ore is credited to Pablo Flores, who began mining and smelting operations near the summit of Buena Vista Peak in 1865. Increasing migration to the area was met with resistance from the Native Americans, which limited early mining efforts. The establishment of Fort Independence allowed for the expulsion of native populations, facilitating the expansion of the mining town.

These early miners employed relatively primitive techniques of open pits and trenches and used adobe ovens to smelt the ore. Businessman Victor Beaudry (younger brother of Los Angeles Mayor and developer Prudent Beaudry) of nearby Independence, California, became impressed by the quality of silver mined at Cerro Gordo and opened a store nearby. He soon acquired several mining claims to settle unpaid debts and proceeded to have two modern smelters built. Beaudry continued acquiring mining rights from debtors until he soon owned a majority of the richest and most productive mines in the area, including partial interest in the Union Mine.

In 1868, Mortimer Belshaw arrived in Cerro Gordo (lit. "Fat Hill" in Spanish), attracted by the rich deposits of galena ore. After establishing a partnership with another stakeholder in the Union Mine, he brought the first wagon load of silver from Cerro Gordo to Los Angeles. In Los Angeles he was able to secure financing to build his own smelter that was superior to all other smelters at Cerro Gordo, as well as to build the first wagon road up the mountain. This road became known as the Yellow Road from the color of the rock that it had been cut through. By operating the Yellow Road as a toll road, Belshaw was able to earn income and control the shipments of silver from the mountain.

Between 1879 to 1880 in Cerro Gordo district,  of ore was raised and treated, $3,307 ($88,088 in 2021) gold bullion produced and $140,517 ($3,742,932 in 2021) worth of silver bullion produced.

By 1907 high-grade zinc ore was found in Cerro Gordo and ore shipments begun and by 1912 Cerro Gordo became the largest producer of zinc carbonates in the US.

In 1916 the town became electrified replacing the steam power that operated the machinery.

In 1920, about ten miners still worked, mostly mining silver-lead ore. Mining had largely ceased by 1938.
, a former high school teacher was the only miner; the then-70-year-old had been collecting small amounts of silver underground since 1997, selling the silver to tourists, while searching for a productive vein.

The ghost town of Cerro Gordo was purchased in June 2018 with the intent to turn it into a tourist attraction, accessed by special permission. The buyers, Brent Underwood and Jon Bier, purchased the property with additional Los Angeles-based investors. The American Hotel, an icehouse, and a residence were destroyed in a fire on June 15, 2020. Despite these challenges, Underwood says he is still committed to the project.

Buildings
{
  "type": "FeatureCollection",
  "features": [
    {
      "type": "Feature",
      "properties": {
	      "title": "American Hotel",
        "marker-symbol": "-number",
        "marker-color": "302060"
      },
      "geometry": {
        "type": "Point",
        "coordinates": [
          36.53737,-117.79537
        ]
      }
    }
  ]
}
The American Hotel was built in 1871 by John Simpson, and was the oldest standing hotel in California on the east side of the Sierra. On the morning of June 15, 2020, a fire destroyed the hotel and neighboring buildings. The owners plan to build a replica.

The Belshaw House was built around 1868 by Mortimer Belshaw, developer of the Belshaw Blast Furnace.

The Gordon House was built in 1909 by Louis D. Gordon, who began the "zinc era" of Cerro Gordo.

Underwood broke ground and commenced to rebuilding The American Hotel in 2022.

In popular culture
Remi Nadeau, a descendant of the family involved with the transport of ingots from Cerro Gordo across Owens Lake and by mule train to Los Angeles, has written books and articles on the period.

In 2013, an episode in the series Artbound entitled "Agh20: Silver and Water" features Cerro Gordo's role as a source of silver for the nascent film industry in California.

Cerro Gordo, the Belshaw House, and the Inyo Mine are featured in the season 19 episode of Ghost Adventures titled "Cerro Gordo Ghost Town", which aired in 2019 on the Travel Channel.

In 2020, one of the town's owners, Brent Underwood, started a YouTube channel chronicling his intended development of the town into a functioning tourist destination and his exploration of mine tunnels.

In 2021, it was revealed the previous owners had sold the mining claims of the nearby area to K2 Gold Corp. There are plans to start a cyanide opencast mine using cyanide in the adjacent Conglomerate Mesa Formation area.

References

Further reading

External links

Cerro Gordo pictures on Ghost Town Gallery
Cerro Gordo - California Ghost Town

Cerro Gordo in USGS Mineral Resource Data System (MRDS)

Ghost towns in Inyo County, California
Mining in California
Inyo Mountains
History of Inyo County, California
History of the Mojave Desert region
History of Los Angeles
Geography of Inyo County, California
American frontier
1866 establishments in California